Aleksey Aygi (stylized as Alexei Aigui, born 11 July 1971) is a Russian composer, violinist, and leader of the 4'33" Ensemble.

Biography and career 

Aigui is ethnically Chuvash and the son of Chuvash national poet Gennadiy Aygi.

A graduate of Moscow's State Music and Pedagogical Institute, Aigui's work has been noted for its minimalist aesthetics. This investment in minimalism led Aigui to name his band after the John Cage composition 4′33″, the score for which instructs performers to refrain from playing their instruments. In 1994, Aigui debuted his 4'33" Ensemble at the Moscow International Festival of Modern Music, with another early performance taking place at the 1996 "European Days in Samara" festival.

Aigui is a prolific composer who has scored dozens of films and television programs, including Country of the Deaf, which received the Russian Guild of Film Critics Award for Best Score; Wild Field, which received a Nika Award, Golden Eagle Award, and Kinotavr Award for Best Music, as well as the White Elephant Award for Best Composer; and the widely-acclaimed I Am Not Your Negro, which was nominated for a Cinema Eye Honors Award for Outstanding Achievement in Original Music Score.

Discography

Leader or co-leader

with Ensemble 4'33"

Selected filmography

References 

20th-century composers
21st-century composers
Russian violinists
21st-century violinists
Recipients of the Nika Award
1971 births
Academicians of the National Academy of Motion Picture Arts and Sciences of Russia
Russian film score composers
21st-century Russian male musicians
20th-century Russian male musicians
Living people
Place of birth missing (living people)